Ihar Fartunau (born 17 April 1973) is a visually impaired Paralympic athlete from Belarus.

Career history
Fartunau competed in the 1996 Summer Paralympics in Atlanta, United States.  There he won a silver medal in the men's Triple jump - F12 event, a silver medal in the men's Long jump - F12 event, a bronze medal in the men's Pentathlon - P12 event and finished fourth in the men's 100 metres - T12 event.  He also competed at the 2000 Summer Paralympics in Sydney, Australia.  There he did not finish in  the men's Pentathlon - P13 event.  He also competed at the 2004 Summer Paralympics in Athens, Greece.    There he won a gold medal in the men's Pentathlon - P13 event, a silver medal in the men's Long jump - F13 event, did not finish in  the men's 100 metres - T13 event and went out in the first round of the men's 200 metres - T13.  He also competed in the men's 100m - T13 at the 2008 Summer Paralympics in Beijing, China but went out in the heats.

In 2003, he set a high jump world record for F13 classified athletes; it still stands ten years later.

References

External links
 

Paralympic athletes of Belarus
Athletes (track and field) at the 1996 Summer Paralympics
Athletes (track and field) at the 2000 Summer Paralympics
Athletes (track and field) at the 2004 Summer Paralympics
Athletes (track and field) at the 2008 Summer Paralympics
Athletes (track and field) at the 2012 Summer Paralympics
Paralympic gold medalists for Belarus
Paralympic silver medalists for Belarus
Paralympic bronze medalists for Belarus
World record holders in Paralympic athletics
Living people
Visually impaired sprinters
Visually impaired long jumpers
Visually impaired high jumpers
Visually impaired triple jumpers
Paralympic sprinters
Paralympic long jumpers
Paralympic high jumpers
Paralympic triple jumpers
1973 births
Medalists at the 1996 Summer Paralympics
Medalists at the 2004 Summer Paralympics
Paralympic medalists in athletics (track and field)
Belarusian male sprinters
Belarusian male long jumpers
Belarusian male high jumpers
Belarusian male triple jumpers
20th-century Belarusian people
21st-century Belarusian people
Belarusian people with disabilities
Blind people